The 1948 Lebanese presidential election was the third presidential election, which was held as parliamentary session on 21 September 1943. The Constitutional Bechara El Khoury was re-elected as the president of Lebanon.

The President is elected by the Members of Parliament. He needs a two-thirds majority to win in the first round, while an absolute majority is enough in the second round. He is always a Maronite Christian by convention.

47 out of 55 deputies attended the session headed by Speaker Sabri Hamadeh. They all elected the incumbent president Bechara El Khoury.

References 

Elections in Lebanon
1948 elections in Asia